Malcolm Fox (March 13, 1906 – August 21, 1968) was an American racecar driver.

Indy 500 results

References

Racing drivers from New Jersey
Indianapolis 500 drivers
1906 births
1968 deaths
People from Westville, New Jersey
Sportspeople from Gloucester County, New Jersey